The Astor on the Lake (also Astor Hotel) is a low-rise building located in the Yankee Hill (East Town) neighborhood of downtown Milwaukee, Wisconsin. It is listed on the National Register of Historic Places.

Designed by architect Herbert Tullgren in Classical Revival style, the Astor Hotel was built in 1920 by developer Oscar Brachman for hotel tycoon Walter Schroeder. The building was originally U-shaped in plan, but an L-shaped addition in 1925 made the building into the E-shape seen today. The building has eight floors and stands 102 feet (31 m) tall.

History 
When the Astor on the Lake opened it was considered one of the finest Midwest hotels of the time. It offered 125 guest rooms with a monthly rent of $100 to $300 depending on size.  The façade is covered with gray limestone and has French Classical details and was constructed using steel-reinforced concrete. A stained glass skylight hangs above the reception area. Many of the rooms, which are now owner-occupied, were of simpler design.

Fire
At dawn on February 18, 1935, the Astor Hotel caught fire.  The fire was caused by electrical wires in the basement and a dense, oily smoke filled the building.  The fire claimed the lives of two adults and two infants. Oscar Teweles, 59, and his nurse, Elsie Saxinger, 40, were killed due to suffocation in his apartment on the fifth floor.  Over 300 people had to be evacuated due to the fire and were sent into the city streets. The damage caused by the fire was estimated at $75,000.

External links 
Astor on the Lake Hotel in Milwaukee
Emporis Buildings listing

References 

Hotel buildings on the National Register of Historic Places in Wisconsin
Culture of Milwaukee
Buildings and structures in Milwaukee
Economy of Milwaukee
National Register of Historic Places in Milwaukee